Articles related to Hong Kong include:

0–9 
123 Democratic Alliance
1950s in Hong Kong
1956 riots
1960s in Hong Kong
1966 riots
1967 riots
1981 riots
1970s in Hong Kong
1980s in Hong Kong
1990s in Hong Kong
2004 Indian Ocean earthquake on Hong Kong, Effect of the
2010 Hong Kong democracy protests
2014 Hong Kong protests
2017 imprisonment of Hong Kong democracy activists
2019 Hong Kong extradition bill
2019–20 Hong Kong protests
2046
3 (telecommunications company)
3030 Press
62nd Venice International Film Festival
July 1 marches
7.1 People Pile
December 2005 protest for democracy in Hong Kong

A
A Better Tomorrow
A Chau
A Chinese Ghost Story
A Chinese Ghost Story Part II
A Kung Ngam
Aberdeen Channel
Aberdeen Channel Bridge
Aberdeen, Hong Kong
Aberdeen Praya Road
Aberdeen Street
ABRS Management and Technology Institute
Action Blue Sky Campaign
action cinema, Hong Kong
Action Committee for Defending the Diaoyu Islands
Adamasta Channel
Adamasta Rock
Admiralty
Admiralty MTR Station
Advanced Level Examination, Hong Kong (HKALE)
Advanced Supplementary Level Examination, Hong Kong (HKASLE)
Agriculture in Hong Kong
Agriculture, Fisheries and Conservation Department
Akers-Jones, David
AIG Tower
Air Hong Kong
Airport Authority Hong Kong
Airport Core Programme
Airport Core Programme Exhibition Centre
Airport Road, Hong Kong
airports and heliports in Hong Kong, List of
Airport, Hong Kong International
Airport Express
Aldrich Bay
Allegations of Hong Kong Police Force misconduct surrounding the 2019–20 Hong Kong protests
am730
Amah Rock
Amoy Food Limited
Amoy Gardens
Andrade, Fernão Pires de
Anstruther, Robert Hamilton
Antiquities and Monuments Office
Antiquities and Monuments Ordinance
Ap Chau
Ap Chau Mei Pak Tun Pai
Ap Chau Pak Tun Pai
Ap Lei Chau
Ap Lei Pai
Ap Lo Chun
Ap Tan Pai
Ap Tau Pai
 Apliu Street
apm Millennium City 5
Apple Daily
April Fifth Action
areas of Hong Kong, List of
Hong Kong Museum of Art
Ashes of Time
Asia Television (ATV)
AsiaWorld-Expo
Argyle Street, Hong Kong
Audit Bureau of Circulations, Hong Kong
Austin Road
Austin, John Cardiner
Avenue of Stars
Aviation history of Hong Kong

B
Baden-Powell International House
Bank of America (Asia)
Bank of China (Hong Kong)
Bank of China Group
Bank of China Tower
Bank of Communications Hong Kong Branch
Bank of East Asia
Banknotes of the Hong Kong dollar
Baptist Lui Ming Choi Secondary School
Baptist University, Hong Kong (HKBU or BU)
Barker, George Digby
Basic Law, Hong Kong
Basic Law Article 23, Hong Kong
Basic Law Article 45, Hong Kong
Basic Law Article 45 Concern Group
Basic Law Article 46, Hong Kong
Bắt đầu từ nay
Battery Path
Battle of Hong Kong
Bauhinia
Bauhinia blakeana
Bay Islet
Beaches of Hong Kong
Beacon Hill
Belcher Bay
Belcher's Street
Belgian Bank
Bernacchi, Brook Antony
Beyond (band)
Big Wave Bay
Bishonen
Black, Robert Brown
Black, Wilsone
Blake, Henry Arthur
Bluff Island
BNP Paribas Hong Kong
Boundary Street
Bowen, George
Bowring, John
Bonham Road
Bonham, Samuel George
Bonham Strand
Boundary Street
Bowen Road
Boy'z
Braemar Hill
Brand Hong Kong
Brandon Learning Centre
Brands and Products Expo, Hong Kong
Breaker Reef
Bremer, James John Gordon
Bride's Pool
Brigade of Gurkhas
British consular protection enjoyed by BN(O) passport holders outside the PRC and the UK
British Forces Overseas Hong Kong
British National (Overseas)
British Dependent Territories citizenship
British Nationality (Hong Kong) Act 1990
British Nationality (Hong Kong) Act 1997
British nationality law and Hong Kong
British Nationality Selection Scheme
Broadview Garden
Broadway Cinematheque
Bronze Bauhinia Star
Brothers, The
Bruce, Frederick William Adolphus
Buddhist Association, Hong Kong
Buddhist Fat Ho Memorial College
Buddhist Hospital, Hong Kong
Buddhist Sin Tak College
Buddhist Tai Hung College
Buddhist Wong Fung Ling College
Buddhist Yip Kei Nam Memorial College
buildings and structures in Hong Kong, List of
Bun Bei Chau
Burgess, Claude Bramall
business schools in Asia, List of
bus route numbering, Hong Kong
Bus spotting
bus transport in Hong Kong, History of
Bus Uncle, The
Bute Street
Butterfly Valley
Butterfly Valley Road

C
Cable TV Hong Kong
Café de Coral
Caine Road
Caine, William
Caldecott, Andrew
Camellia crapnelliana
Camellia granthamiana
Camellia hongkongensis
Cameron, William Gordon
Canal Road
Canton Road
Cantonese Braille
Cantonese grammar
Cantonese, Hong Kong
Cantonese
Cantonese opera
Cantonese people in Hong Kong
Cantonese Pinyin
Cantonese restaurant
Cantonese Romanisation, Hong Kong Government
Cantopop
Cape D'Aguilar
car number plates, Hong Kong
Caritas Hong Kong
Caritas Medical Centre
Caritas St. Joseph Secondary School
Cart noodle
Castle Peak
Castle Peak Bay
Castle Peak Hospital
Castle Peak Road
Cater, Jack
Cathay Pacific
Causes of the 2019–20 Hong Kong protests
Causeway Bay
Causeway Road
Celestial Movies
Census in Hong Kong
Centamap
Center, The
Center for E-Commerce Infrastructure Development
Central, Hong Kong
Central and Western District
Central and Western Democratic Power
Central Library, Hong Kong
Central Market
Central–Mid-Levels escalator
Central Plaza (Hong Kong)
Central Police Station
Certificate of Education Examination, Hong Kong (HKCEE)
CCC Yenching College
Chai Wan
Chai Wan Kok
Chai Wan Park
Chai Wan Road
Cham Shan Monastery
Chan, Anson
Chan Lai So Chun Memorial School
Chan, Peter Ho-sun
Cha chaan teng
channels in Hong Kong, List of
Char siu
Chartered Bank of India, Australia and China
Chater, Catchick Paul
Chater Garden
Chater House
Chater Road
Chatham Road
Chau Tsai
Chau Tsai Kok
Che Kung (God of Protection)
Che Kung Miu
Che Lei Pai
Che people
Chek Chau
Chek Lap Kok
Chen, Kelly
Chen Hsong
Cheng, Albert
Cheng, Sammi
Cheong-Leen, Hilton
Cherry Street, Hong Kong
Cheung Chau
Cheung Chau Bun Festival
Cheung Chi Cheong Memorial Primary School
Cheung Ching Estate
Cheung Ching Estate Community Centre
Cheung Fat Estate
Cheung, Fernando
Cheung Hang Estate
Cheung Hong Estate
Cheung, Jacky
Cheung Kong Holdings
Cheung Kong Centre
Cheung, Leslie
Cheung, Maggie
Cheung On Estate
Cheung Pei Shan Road
Cheung Po Tsai
Cheung Sha Wan
Cheung Sha Wan Road
Cheung Shue Tau
Cheung Tsing Bridge
Cheung Tsing Highway
Cheung Tsing Tunnel
Cheung Wang Estate
Chi Lin Nunnery
Chi Ma Wan
Chiba Bank
Chief Commissioner, Hong Kong
Chief Executive of Hong Kong
Chief Scout of Hong Kong
Chief Executive election, Hong Kong
Chief Secretary for Administration
Ch'ien Kuo Fung, Raymond
China Daily Hong Kong Edition
China Hong Kong City
China Light and Power
China Motor Bus
Chinachem Group
Chinese nationality law – implementation in Hong Kong
Chinese Serial
Chinese Temples Committee
The Chinese University of Hong Kong (CUHK)
Chinese white dolphin
Ching Cheong
Ching Cheung Road
Ching Chung Koon
Ching Nga Court
Ching Shing Court
Ching Wah Court
Chiu, Samson
Chiuchow cuisine
Chiyu Banking Corporation
Choy Gar
Choy Li Fut
Choi Sai Woo Park
Chong Hing Bank
Chow Shouson
Chu Kong Passenger Transport Co., Ltd
Chuk Yuen (disambiguation)
Chun Kwan Temple
Chung Hom Kok
Chung Mei Road
Chung Ying Street
Chungking Mansion
Chow, Stephen
Chow, Vivian
Chow Yun-fat
Chung Sze Yuen
Chungking Mansions
Cinema of Hong Kong
cinemas in Hong Kong, List of
Citibank (Hong Kong)
CITIC Ka Wah Bank
cities and towns in Hong Kong, List of
Citizens Party (Hong Kong)
City Forum
City One
City University of Hong Kong (CityU)
c!ty'super
Civic Act-up
Civil Aid Service (CAS)
Civil Force
Civil Service, Hong Kong
Clementi, Cecil
Clementi Secondary School
Clear Water Bay
Clear Water Bay Road
Clear Water Bay Peninsula
Climate of Hong Kong
Clock Tower, Hong Kong
Closed Area
Closer Economic Partnership Arrangement
CNEC Lui Ming Choi Primary School
Cochrane Street
Cocktail bun
Co-co! Magazine
Coins of the Hong Kong dollar
Colonial Hong Kong
Comics Festival, Hong Kong
Commercial Radio Hong Kong
Commercial Television
Communications in Hong Kong
companies in Hong Kong, List of
Companies listed on the Hong Kong Stock Exchange
Common electrical adaptors in Hong Kong and the United Kingdom
Community Chest of Hong Kong, The
Conduit Road
Confederation of Trade Unions, Hong Kong (HKCTU)
Connaught Place
Connaught Road
Connaught Road Central
Connaught Road West
Container Port Road
Container Terminal 9
Convention and Exhibition Centre, Hong Kong
Correctional Services, Hong Kong
Correctional Services Museum, Hong Kong
Convention for the Extension of Hong Kong Territory (Second Convention of Peking)
Convention of Chuenpi
Convention of Peking
copyright law, Hong Kong
Cosmopolitan Dock
Cotton Tree Drive
Country parks and conservation in Hong Kong
Court of Final Appeal
Cox's Road
Cram schools in Hong Kong
Crapnell's camellia
CRC Oil Storage Depot
Cross-Harbour Tunnel
Crow's Nest
Cuisine of Hong Kong
Culture Centre, Hong Kong
Culture of Hong Kong
Cyberport

D
D'Aguilar Street
D'Aguilar, George Charles
Dah Sing Bank Limited
Dai Pai Dong
Dai pai dong
Dairy Farm
David, Edgeworth Beresford
Davis, John Francis
Davis Street
DBS Bank
DBS Bank (Hong Kong)
Declared monuments of Hong Kong
Deep Bay
Deep Water Bay
Delia Group of Schools, The
Delia (Man Kiu) English Primary School
Democratic Alliance for the Betterment of Hong Kong (DAB)
Democratic Party
Democratisation in Hong Kong
Demographics of Hong Kong
Des Voeux Road
Des Vœux, William
Devil's Peak
Diamond Hill
Dim sum
Diocesan Boys' School, Hong Kong
Direct Subsidy Scheme (DSS)
Discovery Bay
District Council of Hong Kong
Hong Kong District Council election
Districts of Hong Kong
Hong Kong Disneyland Resort
Disneyland Resort line (MTR)
Disneyland Resort station
Hong Kong Disneyland
Hong Kong Disneyland Hotel
Disney's Hollywood Hotel
Dit da
Hong Kong dollar
Christopher Doyle
Dragon boat
Dragon boat race
Dragonair
Drunken Master
Duddell Street
Dundas Street, Hong Kong
Duplicate Tsing Yi South Bridge
Lydia Dunn, Baroness Dunn

E
Eagle's Nest
Easeful Court
East Lamma Channel
East Point, Hong Kong
East Rail line
East Week
Eastern District, Hong Kong
Eastern Express
Eastern Harbour Crossing
East Tsim Sha Tsui station
Easy Finder
Environment of Hong Kong
Hong Kong Economic and Trade Office
Hong Kong Economic Journal
Hong Kong Economic Times
Economy of Hong Kong
EcoPark, Hong Kong
Edinburgh Place
Education and Manpower Bureau
Secretary for Education and Manpower
Education in Hong Kong
The Hong Kong Institute of Education (HKIEd)
Educational Television
Egg tart
Election (2005 film)
Elections in Hong Kong
Electronic Payment Services
Common electrical adaptors in Hong Kong and the United Kingdom
Electric Road
Elgin Street, Hong Kong
Elliot, Charles
Emblem of Hong Kong
Emperor Entertainment Group
Employment in Hong Kong
English language
English Schools Foundation
Enter the Dragon
Entertainment Expo Hong Kong
Environmental Protection Department
Epoch Times, The
Everlasting Regret
Exchange Square
Executive Council of Hong Kong

F
Fa Yuen Street
Fan Kam Road
Fan Lau
Fan Lau Fort
Fanling
Fanling Environmental Resource Centre
Fanling Lodge
Fanling-Sheung Shui New Town
Fan Sin Temple
Father Cucchiara Memorial School
Federation of Students, Hong Kong (HKFS)
Federation of Trade Unions, Hong Kong (HKFTU)
Feel 100%
Festival Walk
Foods of Mankind Museum
Ford, David Robert
harbour crossing of Hong Kong, Fourth
Film Awards, Hong Kong
Filipinos in Hong Kong
Film Archive, Hong Kong
Financial Secretary (Hong Kong)
Fire Services Department
First Opium War
First Pacific Bank
Fish ball
Fisheries in Hong Kong
Fisherman's Wharf, Hong Kong
Flag of Hong Kong
Flagstaff House
Flat Island
Fleming Road
Fleming, Francis
Fo Pang
Fo Tan
Fok Tak Temple
Football Association, Hong Kong
football team, Hong Kong national
Forbes family
Foreign Correspondents' Club, Hong Kong
Foreign domestic helpers in Hong Kong
Foreign relations of Hong Kong
Former Central Magistracy
Former French Mission Building
Former Kowloon British School
Former Marine Police Headquarters Compound
Former Supreme Court Building
Four Asian Tigers
Forsgate, Hugh Moss Gerald
Fortis Bank Asia HK
Freddy (weather)
Free television services, Hong Kong
Fruit Market
Fubon Bank (Hong Kong)
Fuk Wa Street
Functional constituency
Frederick Fung
Fung Shue Wo
Fung Shue Wo Road
Fung Ying Seen Koon
Fut Gar

G
Gage Street
Gammon Construction
List of gaps in Hong Kong
Garden Road, Hong Kong
Garley Building
Gascoigne Road
Gass, Michael David Irving
Gate Lodge
Gateway, The
Generale Belgian Bank
Geography of Hong Kong
Gilwell Campsite
Gimson, Franklin Charles
Gin Drinkers Bay
Gin Drinkers Line
Glenealy
Global China Group Holdings Limited
Glory to Hong Kong
Gloucester Road, Hong Kong
The Gods Must Be Crazy III – V
Gold Bauhinia Star
Golden Bauhinia Square
Golden Computer Arcade
Golden Harvest
Goods and Services Tax
Government Chinese Character Set
Government Dockyard
Government Flying Service
Government Hill
Government House, Hong Kong
Hong Kong Government
Government departments and agencies in Hong Kong
Governor of Hong Kong
Graham Street
Grand Bauhinia Medal
Grantham, Alexander
Grantham's camellia
Greater China
Green Enterprise Initiative
Green Island, Hong Kong
Greenfield Garden
Grenville House
Group Sense PDA
Growth Enterprise Market
Gun Club Hill Barracks
Gutzlaff Street
Gweilo

H
.hk
Ha Tsuen
HAECO
Haddon-Cave, Charles Philip
Haiphong Road
Hakka cuisine
Hakka language
Hakka stuffed tofu
Halward, Nelson Victor
Handover (history)
Handover of Hong Kong
Handover ceremony of Hong Kong in 1997, The
Hang Seng Bank
Hang Seng Index
Hang Seng Composite Index Series
Hang Seng Composite Industry Indexes
Hankow Road
Happy Together (film)
Happy Valley, Hong Kong
Happy Valley Racecourse
Harbour City
harbours in Hong Kong, List of
Harcourt Road
Harcourt, Cecil Halliday Jepson
Hau Kok Tin Hau Temple
Hau Tsz Kok Pai
Hau Wong (Holy Marquis)
Headline Daily
Health Education Exhibition and Resources Centre
Health, Welfare and Food Bureau
Health, Welfare and Food, Secretary for
Hei Ling Chau
heliports in Hong Kong
Heng Fa Chuen
Hennessy Road
Hennessy, John Pope
Heung Yee Kuk
Highcliff
High Court Building (Hong Kong)
High Island
High Street
High West
Higher education in Hong Kong
Higher Level Examination, Hong Kong (HKHLE)
Hillwood Road
Hip Tin temples in Hong Kong
Hiram's Highway
History of Hong Kong
HKR International Limited

Ho, Cyd
Ho Fung College
Ho Lap College
Ho Man Tin
Ho, Stanley
Hoi Ha Wan
Haiphong Road
Hoi Sham Island
Hok Yuen
Hollywood Road
Home Ownership Scheme
Home Return Permit
Hong (Chinese word)
Hongkong and Shanghai Banking Corporation
Hongkonger
Hong Kong 1 July marches
Hong Kong 1967 leftist riots
Hong Kong Academy for Performing Arts
Hong Kong after transfer of sovereignty
Hong Kong Amateur Hockey Club
Hong Kong Association of Banks
Hong Kong and Kowloon Trades Union Council
Hong Kong camellia
Hong Kong cascade frog
Hong Kong China Ferry Terminal
Hong Kong City Hall
Hong Kong at the 2004 Summer Olympics
Hong Kong Club Building
Hong Kong Coliseum
Hong Kong Commercial Daily
Hong Kong croton
Hong Kong Cultural Centre
Hong Kong dollar
Hong Kong drifter
Hong Kong Economic Journal
Hong Kong Economic Times
Hong Kong eating culture
Hong Kong English
Hong Kong Federation of Students
Hong Kong Flu
Hong Kong General Chamber of Commerce
Hong Kong Girl Guides Association
Hong Kong Government Lunar New Year kau chim tradition
Hong Kong Heritage Discovery Centre
Hong Kong Heritage Museum
Hong Kong High End Audio Visual Show
Hong Kong honours system
Hong Kong Housing Authority Exhibition Centre
Hong Kong Human Rights and Democracy Act
The Hong Kong Institute of Education (HKIEd)
Hong Kong Institute of Languages
Hong Kong Institute of Vocational Education (Tsing Yi)
Hong Kong International Film Festival
Hong Kong International Airport
Hong Kong International School
Hong Kong Island
Hong Kong Kids phenomenon
Hongkong Land
Hong Kong landmarks and tourist attractions
Hong Kong Link
Hong Kong-Macau Ferry Pier
Hong Kong–Mainland China conflict
Hong Kong Ministerial Conference of the World Trade Organization
Hong Kong Museum of History
Hong Kong Nang Yan College of Higher Education
Hong Kong national football team
Hong Kong newt
Hong Kong Note Printing Limited
Hong Kong Observatory
Hong Kong Park
Hong Kong People's Alliance on WTO
Hong Kong Planning and Infrastructure Exhibition Gallery
The Hong Kong Polytechnic University (PolyU)
Hong Kong Professional Teachers' Union (HKPTU)
Hongkong Post
Hong Kong Progressive Alliance
Hong Kong Property Services (Agency)
Hong Kong protests
Hong Kong returnee
Hong Kong Secondary Students Union
Hong Kong Sevens
Hong Kong Shue Yan College
Hong Kong Stadium
Hong Kong Student Welfare Association
Hong Kong studies
Hong Kong Studies (journal)
Hong Kong-style western cuisine
Hong Kong Taoist Association
Hong Kong Trail
Hong Kong University of Science and Technology, The (HKUST)
Hong Kong United Dockyard
Hong Kong Way
Hong Kong-Zhuhai-Macau Bridge
Hongkong International Terminals Ltd.
Hong Nin Savings Bank
Hopewell Centre, Hong Kong
Hopewell Holdings Ltd
Hopewell Highway Infrastructure Ltd
Hospital Authority
hospitals in Hong Kong, List of
HSBC
HSBC Hong Kong headquarters building
Hu, Henry Hung-lick
Hui, Michael
Hui, Rafael
Hui, Ricky
Hui, Samuel
Hui, Chiu-yin John
Hui, Chung-shing Herman
Hung Fut
Hung Hing Road
Hung Hom
Hung Hom Bay
Hung Ga Kuen
Hung, Sammo
Hung Shing Temple
Hutchison Whampoa

I
I-CABLE Communications Limited
I Shing Temple
Ice House Street
Immaculate Conception Cathedral of Hong Kong
Imperial China, Hong Kong during
In the Mood for Love
Independent Commission Against Corruption
Individual Visit Scheme
Industrial and Commercial Bank of China (Asia) (ICBC (Asia))
Infernal Affairs
Initial D
Inland Revenue Department (Hong Kong)
Inspiration Lake Recreation Centre
International Finance Centre (Hong Kong)
International Commerce Center
List of international schools in Hong Kong
Regina Ip
Island House
Island line (MTR)
Island School
Islands District, Hong Kong
Islands of Hong Kong
Isogai, Rensuke

J
Jao Tsung-I
Japanese military yen
Japanese occupation of Hong Kong (Three years and eight months)
 Jardine Aviation Services
Jardine House
Jardine Matheson Group
Jardine Matheson Holdings Limited
Jardine Strategic Holdings Limited
William Jardine
Jardine's Bazaar
Jau Gwai
Java Road
JETCO
Jiaobei
The Hong Kong Jockey Club
John Walden
Johnston, Reginald
Johnston Road
Joint Organization of Unions - Hong Kong
Joint Street
Joint University Programmes Admissions System (JUPAS)
Jordan (Area)
Jordan station
Jordan Road
Joss house
Joss House Bay
Hong Kong Journalists Association
Judiciary of Hong Kong
Justice For All
Justice, Secretary for
Justice Union
Jubilee Street
Junk Keying
Jumbo Kingdom
Jyutping

K
K. L. Dhammajoti
Kadoorie Farm and Botanic Garden
Kadoorie, Michael
Kaifong associations
Kai Tak Airport
Kai Tak Tunnel
Kai-to
Kam Chuk Kok
Kam Shan Country Park
Kam Sheung Road station
Kam Tin
Kam Tin Road
Kao Se Tseien, Nicholas
Kap Shui Mun
Kap Shui Mun Bridge
Kat O
Kau chim
Kau Kee Restaurant
Kau Pui Lung
Kau Sai Chau
Kau Wa Keng
Kau Yi Chau
Kei Ling Ha
Kei Ling Ha Lo Wai
Kellett Bay
Kellett Island
Kennedy, Arthur Edward
Kennedy Road
Kennedy Town
Keswick family, The
Khalsa Diwan Sikh Temple
The Killer
Kimberley Street
King George V School
King's College
King's Road
Kissel, Nancy
Kitchee
Knutsford Terrace
Koo, Joseph
Kornhill
Kowloon
Kowloon Bay
Kowloon–Canton Railway
Kowloon-Canton Railway Corporation
Kowloon City
Kowloon railway station (KCR)
Kowloon Masjid and Islamic Centre
Kowloon station (MTR)
Kowloon Park
Kowloon Peak
Kowloon Peninsula
Kowloon Rock
Kowloon Tong
Kowloon Walled City
Kumquat
Kung Kao Po
Kwai Chung
Kwai Chung Incineration Plant
Kwai Chung Hospital
Kwai Chung Road
Kwai Fong
Kwai Fong station
Kwai Tsing Container Terminals
Kwai Tsing District
Kwan Kung (Martial Deity)
Kwan Kung Pavilion
Kwan Tai temples in Hong Kong
Kwan Tak-hing
Kwan, Stanley
Kwok, Aaron
Kwok, Kenix
Kwong Wah Hospital
Kwun Chung
Kwun Tong
Kwun Tong Bypass
Kwun Tong District
Kwun Tong Road
Kwun Yam (Bodhisattva of Compassion)
Kwun Yam Shrine

L
Ladder Street
Ladder streets
Lai Chack Middle School
Lai, Jimmy
Lai Chi Kok
Lai Chi Kok Amusement Park
Lai Chi Kok Bay
Lai Chi Kok Road
Lai Chi Kok station
Lai King station
Lai Man Wai
Lakes of Hong Kong
Lam Chau
Lam Sai-wing
Lam Tin
Lam Tsuen wishing trees
Lam, Ringo
Lamma Island
Lan Kwai Fong
Landmark, The
Landmarks and tourist attractions, Hong Kong
Langham Place
Language Proficiency Assessment for Teachers (LPAT)
Languages of Hong Kong
Lantau Channel
Lantau Island
Lantau Link
Lantau Link Visitors Centre
Lantau Peak
Lantau Trail
Lau Kar-leung
Lau Kar-wing
Lau, Andrew
Lau, Ambrose
Lau, Emily
Law Uk Folk Museum
Lawrence, Akandu
Lazy Mutha Fucka (LMF)
Le Meridien Cyberport Hotel
Lee, Ambrose
Lee, Bruce
Lee, Coco
Lee, Hacken
Lee, Hysan
Lee, Martin
Lee Garden
Lee Wing Tat
Lee Tung Street
Legal system of Hong Kong
Legislative Council of Hong Kong
Legislative Council Complex
Legislative election, Hong Kong
Lei Cheng Uk
Lei Cheng Uk Han Tomb Museum
Lei Muk Shue
Lei Yue Mun
Lei Yue Mun Bay
Lei Yue Mun Fort
Lei Yue Mun Road
Leighton Road
Leisure and Cultural Services Department
Lek Yuen
Lennon Wall (Hong Kong)
Leung, Antony
Leung Chun Ying
Leung, Elsie
Leung, Gigi
Leung Long Chau
Leung So Kee
Leung Chiu Wai, Tony
Leung Ka Fai, Tony
Li, Arthur
Li, Richard
Li, Victor
Liberal Party
Liberate Hong Kong, the revolution of our times
Libraries in Hong Kong, List of
Light pollution in Hong Kong
Light Rail (MTR)
Lights Out Hong Kong
Lin Fa Temple
Ling, Andrew
Lingnan University (Hong Kong)
Ling Wan Ting
Ling To Monastery
Lin, Paul
Link REIT, The
Linked exchange rate system
Lion Rock
Lion Rock Spirit
Lions Nature Education Centre
Lippo Centre
Little Fighter Online
Liu To
Liu To Bridge
Lo Pan Temple
Lo Wu
Lobo, Rogerio Hyndman
Lockhart, James Stewart
Lockhart Road
Lok Ma Chau
Lok Sin Tong Leung Chik Wai Memorial School
Long Win Bus
Long Valley, Hong Kong
Lower Albert Road
Lugard, Frederick
Luen Wo Hui
John C.S. Lui
Lung Cheung Road
Lung Fu Shan Country Park
Lung Kwu Chau

M
Ma Lik
Ma Liu Shui
Ma On Shan
Ma On Shan (peak)
Ma On Shan Country Park
Ma On Shan line
Ma Shi Chau
Ma Tau Wai
Ma Wan
Ma Wan Channel
MacDonnell Road
MacDonnell, Richard Graves
MacDougall, David Mercer
MacLehose, Crawford Murray
MacLehose Trail
Madame Tussauds Hong Kong
Magazine Gap Road
Mahjong scoring rules, Hong Kong
Mahjong culture
Mai Po
Mai Po Marshes
Mainland China
Mak, Alice
Man Kam To
Man Luen Choon
Mandarin Airlines Flight 642
Mandarin Oriental
Mandatory provident fund (MPF)
Ma Wan Channel
Man Mo Temple
Man Wa Lane
Marsh, William Henry
Maritime Square
Maritime Museum, Hong Kong
Martial arts film
Matheson James
May, Francis Henry
Mayfair Gardens
McDull
McHardy, Alexander Anderson
McMug
Medal of Honour
Medal for Bravery (Bronze)
Medal for Bravery (Gold)
Medal for Bravery (Silver)
Media in Hong Kong
Metropolis Daily
Hong Kong Museum of Medical Sciences
Mei Foo Sun Chuen
Mercer, William Thomas
MEVAS Bank
Mid-Levels
Middle Road
milk tea, Hong Kong-style
Military of Hong Kong
Military Service Corps, Hong Kong
Minden, HMS
Mithaiwala, Dorabjee Naorojee
Ming Pao
Mint, Hong Kong
Mirs Bay
Miss Hong Kong Pageant
Mister Softee
Miu Fat Buddhist Monastery
Mo lei tau
Modern Terminals Limited
Mody Road
Money Times
Monetary Authority, Hong Kong
Mong Kok
Mong Kok District
Mong Kok Tsui
Morrison Hill Road
Morse, Arthur
Morrison, John Robert
Mother's Choice (Hong Kong)
Motorola DragonBall
Mount Nicholson
Mount Parker
Mountain Lodge
mountains, peaks and hills in Hong Kong, List of
movies set in Hong Kong, List of
Moy Lin-shin
MTR
MTR Corporation Limited
MTR Property
List of MTR stations
Mui, Anita
Mui Wo
Mun Tsai Tong
Murray Barracks
Murray House
Museums in Hong Kong
Hong Kong Museum of Art
Hong Kong Museum of Coastal Defence
Hong Kong Museum of History
Hong Kong Museum of Medical Sciences
Music of Hong Kong
My life as McDull
My Lucky Stars

N
Nai Chung
Nam Fung Chau
Nam Fung Sun Chuen
Nam Wan
Nam Wan Kok
Nam Wan Tunnel
Nan Lian Garden
Nanyang Commercial Bank
Nathan, Matthew
Nathan Road
National anthem of Hong Kong
National Commercial Bank,　The
National Industrial Bank of China
Nepalese people in Hong Kong
New Century Forum
New Evening Post
New Kowloon
New Territories
New World Centre
New World First Bus
New World Development Co. Ltd.
New World First Ferry
New Youth Forum
newspapers of Hong Kong, List of
Next Magazine
Next Media
Ng Tsang Lau
Nga Ying Chau
Ngau Chi Wan
Ngau Tau Kok
Nicoll, John Fearns
Niimi, Masaichi
Ninepin Group
Noon-day Gun
Norman-Walker, Hugh Selby
North District, Hong Kong
North Point
Northcote, Geoffry Alexander Stafford
Now Business News Channel
Now TV
NOW.com

O
O'Brien, George Thomas Michael
Observatory, Hong Kong
Observatory Hill
Observatory Road
Ocean Park
Ocean Terminal
Octopus card
Ohel Leah Synagogue
Oktoberfest
Oi Kwan Road
Oi! arts center
Old Bailey Street
Old Industrial Buildings Revitalization in Hong Kong
Old Master Q
Old Supreme Court Building, Hong Kong
Old Wan Chai Post Office
One-Armed Swordsman
One country, two systems
One Island East
The Open University of Hong Kong
Opium War, First
Opium War, Second
order of precedence, Hong Kong
Organisations with former royal patronage in Hong Kong
Oriental Daily News
Oriental Heroes (manhua)
Origins of names of cities and towns in Hong Kong
Outlying Islands
Outward Processing Arrangement (OPA)
Over the Rainbow (organization)

P
Pacific Place
Pak Tam Chung
Pak Tsz Lane Park
Pang uk
Pao, Eugene
Papier-mache offering shops in Hong Kong
Paradise Mall
Park Island Transport Company Limited
Parsi
Pat Sin Leng
parks and gardens of Hong Kong
Parker, Mount
PARKnSHOP
Lord Patten of Barnes
Pay television services, Hong Kong
Pau Shiu-hung
PCCW
Peak Tram
Peaked Hill
Pearl River (China)
Pearl River Delta
Pedder Street
Peel, William
Peel Street
Pei Ho Street
Peking Opera School
Peking Road
Ieoh Ming Pei
Penfold Park
Performing Artistes Guild, Hong Kong
Peng Chau
Peninsula Hong Kong, The
Peninsula Hotels, The
Penny's Bay
People's Liberation Army Hong Kong Garrison
Percival Street
Perhaps Love
Personal Emergency Link
Philharmonic Orchestra, Hong Kong
Phoenix Television
Pillar Island
Pineapple bun
Ping Chau
Ping Shan
Piper's Hill
Place names of Hong Kong
Places of worship in Hong Kong
planning areas in Hong Kong, List of
Plaza Hollywood
Plover Cove
Plover Cove Reservoir
List of Hong Kong poets
Po Lam Road
Po Lin Monastery
Po Leung Kuk
Po Leung Kuk Lo Kit Sing (1983) College
Po Leung Kuk Chan Yat Primary School
Po Leung Kuk Museum
Po Leung Kuk Tsing Yi Secondary School (Skill Opportunity)
Po Sang Bank
Po Toi
Po Toi Islands
Pok Fu Lam
Pok Fu Lam Road
Pokfield Road
Police Force, Hong Kong
Police Museum
Police Tactical Unit (PTU)
Politics of Hong Kong
political parties in Hong Kong, List of
The Hong Kong Polytechnic University (PolyU)
Poon choi
Port and Airport Development Strategy
Port of Hong Kong
Portland Street
Possession Point
Possession Street
Postage stamps and postal history of Hong Kong
Henry Pottinger
Pottinger Street
Pre-history of Hong Kong
Prince Edward, Hong Kong
Prince Edward Road
Prince of Wales Building
Prince of Wales Hospital
Prince's Building
Princess Margaret Hospital
Princess Margaret Road
Principal Officials Accountability System (POAS)
prisons in Hong Kong, List of
Pro-democracy camp (Hong Kong)
Proper Cantonese pronunciation
protected species in Hong Kong, List of
Provisional Legislative Council
PTU (film)
Public Bank
Public holidays in Hong Kong
Public Library, Hong Kong
Public Square Street
Pui O
Punti
Punti-Hakka Clan Wars
Pyramid Rock

Q
Quah Chow Cheung
Quarry Bay
Queen Elizabeth, RMS
Queen Elizabeth Hospital
Queen Mary Hospital
Queen Victoria Street
Queen's College
Queen's Pier
Queen's Road
Queensway

R
Radio Television Hong Kong
Rail gauges and power supply of Hong Kong rails
Railway Museum, Hong Kong
Rail transport in Hong Kong
Rambler Channel
Rambler Channel Bridge (railway bridge)
Rambler Crest
RAF Kai Tak
RAF Sek Kong
Reactions to the 2014 Hong Kong protests
Reactions to the 2019–20 Hong Kong protests
Reclaim Sheung Shui Station
Reclamation Street
Red Cross, Hong Kong
Red House
Regional Council
Regional Services Department
Reis, Michelle
Reform Club (Hong Kong)
Regional Council
Repulse Bay
Reservoirs in Hong Kong
Rice congee
Right of abode issue, Hong Kong
Rivers of Hong Kong
Rivers, Gregory Charles
Road to Hong Kong, The

Roberts, Denys
Robinson, Hercules
Robinson, William
Robinson Road, Hong Kong
Romer's tree frog
Rooftop slum
Rosary Church
Rosaryhill School
Route 1
Route 2
Route 3
Route 4
Route 5
Route 7
Route 8
Route 9
Route Twisk
Royal Hong Kong Yacht Club
Royal Hong Kong Auxiliary Air Force
The Royal Hong Kong Regiment (The Volunteers)
Rumsey Rock
Rumsey Street

S
Sakai, Takashi
Sai chaan
Sai Kung
Sai Kung Town
Sai Kung District
Sai Kung Peninsula
Sai Shan
Sai Sha Road
Sai Shan Road
Sai Shan Village
Sai Tso Wan, Tsing Yi
Sai Wan
Sai Yeung Choi Street
Sai Ying Pun
Sai Ying Pun Community Complex
Sam Tai Tsz Temple and Pak Tai Temple
St. Andrew's Church
St. John's Cathedral
St. Joseph's College
St. Mary's Canossian College
St. Paul's Co-educational College
St. Paul's College
St. Paul's Convent School
St. Paul's Secondary School
Sales, Arnaldo de Oliveira
Salisbury Road
Sam Pui Chau
Sam Tung Uk Museum
Sampan
San Po Kong
San Tin
Sandbars in Hong Kong
Sandy Bay
Sandy Ridge
Sassoon Road
Sau Choi Mansion
Science Museum, Hong Kong
Science Park, Hong Kong
Science and Technology, The Hong Kong University of (HKUST)
schools in Hong Kong, List of
Scout Association of Hong Kong, The
Seamen's Institute
Seamen's strike of 1922
Second Opium War
Serene Garden
Seven Swords
Severe acute respiratory syndrome (SARS)
Severn, Claud
SARS coronavirus
SARS outbreak, Progress of the
Sha Chau
Sha Lo Wan
Sha On Street
Sha Tau Kok
Sha Tau Kok Railway
Sha Tau Kok Road
Sha Tin
Sha Tin District
Sha Tin New Town
Sha Tin Pass
Sha Tin Park
Sha Tin Town Hall
Sham Chun River
Sham Shui Po
Sham Shui Po District
Sham Shui Po Park
Sham Shui Po Police Station
Sham Tseng
Shanghai Commercial Bank
Shanghai Street
Shangri-La Hotels and Resorts
Shantung Street
Shaolin Soccer
Shap Pat Heung
Sharp Peak
Shau Kei Wan Road
Shaw Brothers Studio
Shaw Prize
Run Run Shaw
Shek Kong
Shek Kong Airfield
Shek O
Shek Pai Wan
Shek Shan
Shek Tong Tsui
Shek Wan
Sheng Kung Hui
Sheng Kung Hui Ho Chak Wan Primary School
Sheng Kung Hui Tsing Yi Chu Yan Primary School
Sheng Kung Hui Tsing Yi Estate Ho Chak Wan Primary School
Sheung Shui
Sheung Wan
Sheung Yiu Folk Museum
Shing Mun Country Park
Shing Mun River
Shing Wong
Shing Tai Road
Shing Wong Street
Ship Street
Shouson Hill
Shui Cham Tsui Pai
Shun Lee
Sik Kok Kwong
Silver Bauhinia Star
Silvercord
Sin Hua Bank
Sing Pao Daily News
Sing Tao Daily
Sino-British Joint Declaration
Sino-British Joint Liaison Group
Site of Special Scientific Interest
Siu A Chau
Siu Sai Wan
Siu Sai Wan Road
Six States Installation of Minister murder
Sixth form college
S. L. Wong Cantonese romanisation
S. L. Wong Cantonese transcription
Smith, Norman Lockhart
Smithfield
Sok Kwu Wan
So Kwun Wat
So Man-fung
So Uk
So Uk Estate
Soho, Hong Kong
Soko Islands
Sorrento
South Asians in Hong Kong
South China Athletic Association
South China Morning Post
South China Sea
South Island School
South Lantau Road
Southern District
Southorn, Wilfrid Thomas
Soy Street
Space Museum, Hong Kong
Special Administrative Region
Species first discovered in Hong Kong
The Standard (Hong Kong)
Standard Chartered Bank
Standing Committee on Pressure Groups (SCOPG)
Stanley, Hong Kong
Stanley Street
Star Ferry
Star House
STAR TV
Statue Square
Staunton Street
Staveley, Charles William Dunbar
Staveley Street
Staveley, William
Stewart, Frederick
Stinky tofu
Stock Exchange, Hong Kong
Stone Circles
Stone wall trees in Hong Kong
Stonecutters Bridge
Stonecutters Island
St. Paul's Co-educational College
streets and roads in Hong Kong, List of
Stubbs, Reginald Edward
Stubbs Road
Sub-replacement fertility
Subterranean rivers in Hong Kong
Sudden Weekly
Sulphur Channel
The Sun
Sunset Peak
Sun Yat-sen
Sun Yat-sen Museum, Dr.
Sunday Examiner
Sun Yee On
Sung Wong Toi
Sunshine Island
Sunny Bay
Swire Hall
Swire Group
Swiss wing
The Swordsman (1990 film)
Szeto Wah

T
Ta Kung Pao
Ta Kwu Ling
Taai Ping Ching Jiu
Table sharing
Tactics and methods surrounding the 2019–20 Hong Kong protests
Tai A Chau
Tai Fu Tai Mansion
Tai Kok Tsui
Tai Koo
Tai Lam Country Park
Tai Mo Shan
Tai Nam Wan
Tai O
Tai O Road
Tai-Pan
Tai Ping Shan Street
Tai Po
Tai Po District
Tai Po Kau
Tai Po Kau Station
Tai Po New Town
Tai Po Road
Taishan language
Tai Tam
Tai Tam Harbour
Tai Tam Reservoirs
Tai Tam Road
Tai Wai
Tai Wan, Hung Hom
Tai Wan Road
Tai Wong Temple, Yuen Long Kau Hui
Taikoo Dockyard
Taikoo Place
Taikoo Shing
List of tallest buildings in Hong Kong
Tam Kon Shan
Tam Kon Shan Interchange
Tam Kon Shan Road
Tam Kung (Deity)
Tam, Patrick
Tam, Patrick (film director)
 Tam, Patrick (actor)
Tam, Roman

HMS Tamar (shore station)
Tamar site
Tan Shan River
Tanaka, Hisaichi
Tanka (ethnic group)
Tang, Henry
Tap Mun
Tate's Cairn
Tate's Cairn Highway
Tathong Channel
Taxicabs of Hong Kong
tea culture, Hong Kong
Teesdale, Edmund Brinsley
Telecommunications industry in Hong Kong
Telegraph Bay
Television Broadcasts Limited (TVB)
Tell me
Temple Street
Temporary housing area (THA)
Ten Thousand Buddhas Monastery
Teochew language
The Center
The Cross-Harbour (Holdings) Ltd
The Landmark (Hong Kong)
The Peninsula Hong Kong
The World of Suzie Wong
Thomson Road
Three Fathoms Cove
Tian'anmen Square protests of 1989
Tian Tan Buddha
Tide Cove
Tien, James
Tien, Michael
Tierra Verde
Tiger Balm Garden
Time, Hong Kong
Timeline of Hong Kong history
Timeline of the 2019–20 Hong Kong protests (March–June 2019)
Timeline of the 2019–20 Hong Kong protests (July 2019)
Timeline of the 2019–20 Hong Kong protests (August 2019)
Timeline of the 2019–20 Hong Kong protests (September 2019)
Timeline of the 2019–20 Hong Kong protests (October 2019)
Timeline of the 2019–20 Hong Kong protests (November 2019)
Timeline of the 2019–20 Hong Kong protests (December 2019)
Timeline of the 2019–20 Hong Kong protests (January 2020)
Timeline of the 2019–20 Hong Kong protests (February 2020)
Timeline of the 2019–20 Hong Kong protests (March 2020)
Timeline of the 2019–20 Hong Kong protests (April 2020)
Timeline of the 2019–20 Hong Kong protests (May 2020)
Timeline of the 2019–20 Hong Kong protests (June 2020)
Timeline of the 2019-20 Hong Kong protests (July 2020)
Times Square
Tin Hau (Goddess of Sea)
Tin Hau (area)
Tin Hau MTR Station
Tin Hau temples in Hong Kong
Tin Hau Temple, Causeway Bay
Tin Hau Temple, Joss House Bay
Tin Hau Temple Complex, Yau Ma Tei
Tin Shui Wai
Tin Tin Daily News
Ting Kau Bridge
Tiu Keng Leng
Tivoli Garden
To Kau Wan
To Kit
To Kwa Wan
Tolo Channel
Tolo Harbour
TOM Group
Tong Fuk
Tong Shui Road
Tonkin Street
Tonnochy Road
Tonnochy, Malcolm Struan
Tourism in Hong Kong
Towngas
Trade mark law of Hong Kong
Trains on the MTR
Tramways, Hong Kong
Training bus
Transfer of the sovereignty of Hong Kong
Transport in Hong Kong
Trappist Haven Monastery
Treaty of Nanking
Trench, David Clive Crosbie
Tsang, Donald
Tsang Yok Sing
Tsat Tsz Mui
Tsat Tsz Mui Road
Tse, Nicholas
Tseung Kwan O
Tseung Kwan O MTR Station
Tseung Kwan O Industrial Estate
Tseung Kwan O Tunnel
Tsim Sha Tsui
Tsim Sha Tsui MTR Station
Tsim Sha Tsui Ferry Pier
Tsim Sha Tsui Fire Station
Tsing Kwai Highway
Tsing Lai Bridge
Tsing Leng Tsui
Tsing Long Highway
Tsing Lung Tau
Tsing Ma Bridge
Tsing Ma Control Area
Tsing Shan Monastery
Tsing Yan Temporary Housing Area
Tsing Yi
Tsing Yi MTR Station
Tsing Yi Bay
Tsing Yi South Bridge
Tsing Yi Estate
Tsing Yi Fire Station
Tsing Yi Fishermen's Children's Primary School
Tsing Yi Heung Sze Wui Road
Tsing Yi Interchange
Tsing Yi Lutheran Village
Tsing Yi Municipal Services Building
Tsing Yi Nature Trail
Tsing Yi North Bridge
Tsing Yi North Coastal Road
Tsing Yi Park
Tsing Yi Peak
Tsing Yi Pier
Tsing Yi Police Station
Tsing Yi Promenade
Tsing Yi Public Library
Tsing Yi Public School
Tsing Yi Road
Tsing Yi Road West
Tsing Yi Rural Committee
Tsing Yi South Fire Station
Tsing Yi Sports Ground
Tsing Yi Swimming Pool
Tsing Yi Tong
Tsing Yi Town
Tsing Yi Town Centre
Tsuen Wan
Tsuen Wan District
Tsuen Wan Environmental Resource Centre
Tsuen Wan MTR Station
Tsuen Wan New Town
Tsui Hark
Tsui Museum of Art
Tsui Po Ko
Tsz Shan Monastery
Tsz Wan Shan
Tu, Elsie
Tuen Mun
Tuen Mun District
Tuen Mun New Town
Tuen Mun Road
Tuen Ng Festival
Tung Chao Yung
Tung Chee Hwa
Tung Choi Street
Tung Chung
Tung Chung Battery
Tung Chung Fort
Tung Lin Kok Yuen
Tung Lo Wan Road
Tung Lung Chau
Tung Lung Fort
Tung Po Tor Monastery
Tung Wah Coffin Home
Tung Wah Charity Show
Tung Wah Group of Hospitals
Tung Wah Group of Hospitals Chow Yin Sum Primary School
Tung Wah Group of Hospitals Museum
Tung Wah Group of Hospitals S. C. Gaw Memorial College
Tung Wah Group of Hospitals Wong See Sum Primary School
Tung Ying Building
TVB8
TVB Jade
TVB Pearl
TVB News
TVB programmes, List of
Twins (band)
Typhoon shelter

U
Uncles of Victoria Park
Unequal Treaties
Union Square Phase 7
United Democrats of Hong Kong
University Grants Committee (Hong Kong)
universities in Hong Kong, List of
University of Hong Kong, The (HKU)
University Museum and Art Gallery
Upper Albert Road
Upper Lascar Row
Upstairs Cafés in Hong Kong
Urban Council
Urban Council Centenary Garden
urban public parks and gardens of Hong Kong, List of
Urban Renewal Authority
Urban Services Department
Urmston Road

V
Victoria Barracks
Victoria City
Victoria Harbour
Victoria Harbour crossings
Victoria Park
Victoria Peak
Victoria Peak Garden
Victoria Prison
Victoria Road
Vidal, Jill
Villa Esplanada
Violet Hill
villages in Hong Kong, List of
Visual Arts Centre, Hong Kong
Vitasoy
Vietnamese people in Hong Kong
VTech

W
Waglan Island
Wah Fu
Wah Fu Estate
Wah Yan College, Hong Kong
Wah Yan College, Kowloon
Waitau
Waldegrave, George Turner
Walla-walla
Walled villages of Hong Kong
Wan Chai
Wan Chai District
Wan Chai Pak Tai Temple
Wan Chai Pier
Wang Tau Hom
Waste management in Hong Kong
Water supply and sanitation in Hong Kong
Waterloo Road, Hong Kong
Watson's
Waves of mass migrations from Hong Kong
Webb, David Michael
Wellcome
Wellington Barracks
Wellington Street
Wen Wei Po
West Kowloon Cultural District
West Kowloon Waterfront Promenade
West Island School
West Lamma Channel
West Rail line
West Rail Sightseeing Bus
western cuisine, Hong Kong-style
Western Harbour Crossing
Western Market
West Point
Wetland Park, Hong Kong
Whampoa Dock, Hong Kong and
Whampoa Garden
Wharf (Holdings), The
Wharf Road
Whatever Will Be, Will Be (1995 film)
Whitfield, Henry Wase
Whitfield Barracks
Whitty Street
Wilson, David, Baron Wilson of Tillyorn
Wilson Trail
Wind and Structural Health Monitoring System
Wing Chun
Wing Hang Bank
Wing Hang Bank Limited
Wing Kut Street
Wing Lok Street
Wing Lung Bank
Wing On Street
Wing On Bank
Wing On House
Wing Sing Street
Wo Che
Wok Tai Wan
Wong, Anthony (Wong Chau Sang)
Wong, Anthony (Wong Yiu Ming)
Wong Chuk Hang
Wong, Faye
Wong Fei Hung
Wong Kar Wai
Wong Kwok Pun
Wong Jim (James Wong)
Wong, Joey
Wong, Joseph
Wong, Marti
Wong Nai Chung
Wong Nai Chung Gap
Wong Nai Chung Road
Wong Shek
Wong Tai Sin (Deity)
Wong Tai Sin, Hong Kong
Wong Tai Sin District
Wong Tai Sin Temple (Hong Kong)
Wong Wan Chau
Wong Yuk-man, Raymond
Wong, Wyman
The World of Suzie Wong
World Trade Centre (Hong Kong)
Written Cantonese
WTO Ministerial Conference of 2005
Wu, Gordon
Wun Yiu Village
Wyndham Street

X
Xinhua News Agency
XO sauce

Y
Yacht people
Yam, Joseph
Yam O
Yang, Ti Liang
Yaohan
Yau Kom Tau (disambiguation)
Yau Ma Tei
Yaumati Ferry, Hongkong and
Yaumati Theatre
Yau, Shing-Tung
Yau Tong
Yau Tsim Mong District
Yee Wo Street
Yen Chow Street
Yen, Donnie
Yeung, Miriam
Yeung Sum
Ying Wa College
Yip Kai Koon
Yiu Tung Public Library
York Road, Hong Kong
Youde, Edward
Young, Mark Aitchison
Youth Conference
Yu, Patrick
Yuen, Anita
Yucca de Lac
Yue Chinese
Yue Man Square
Yuen Biao
Yuen Kong Chau
Yuen Long
Yuen Long District
Yuen Long New Town
Yuen Long Plain
Yuen Long Town
Yuen Long Tin Shui Wai Democratic Alliance
Yuen Wo Road
Yuen Woo-ping
Yuen Tsuen Ancient Trail
Yuen Yuen Institute
Yuk Hui Temple
Yuk Wong Kung Din
Yung, Joey
Yung Shue Ha
Yung Shue Tau
Yung Shue Wan

Z
Zoological and Botanical Gardens, Hong Kong

See also

List of Hongkongers
List of Macao-related topics
List of China-related topics
List of Taiwan-related topics
List of Republic of China-related topics
List of Tibet-related topics
Lists of country-related topics

 
Hong Kong